Rai Muhamamd Usman Khan Kharal (born 9 September 1972) is a Pakistani politician who was a Member of the Provincial Assembly of the Punjab, from May 2013 to May 2018.

Early life and education
He was born on 9 September 1972 in Faisalabad.

He has a degree of Bachelor of Arts which he obtained in 1995 from University of the Punjab.

Political career

He was elected to the Provincial Assembly of the Punjab as an independent candidate from Constituency PP-56 (Faisalabad-VI) in 2013 Pakistani general election. He joined Pakistan Muslim League (N) in May 2013.

References

Living people
Punjab MPAs 2013–2018
1972 births
Pakistan Muslim League (N) politicians
University of the Punjab alumni
Politicians from Faisalabad